The 2015–16 season was Frosinone Calcio's first-ever season in Serie A. The team was promoted to the first division after finishing second in the 2014–15 Serie B, and competed in Serie A and the Coppa Italia. They were relegated back down to Serie B after just one season in the top flight.

Players

Squad information

  (vice-captain)

Transfers

In

Loans in

Out

Competitions

Serie A

League table

Results by round

Matches

Coppa Italia

Statistics

Appearances and goals

Goalscorers
Last updated:14 May 2016

References

Frosinone Calcio seasons
Frosinone